Evernia prunastri, also known as oakmoss, is a species of lichen. It can be found in many mountainous temperate forests throughout the Northern Hemisphere. Oakmoss grows primarily on the trunk and branches of oak trees, but is also commonly found on the bark of other deciduous trees and conifers such as fir and pine. The thalli of oakmoss are short (3–4 cm in length) and bushy, and grow together on bark to form large clumps. Oakmoss thallus is flat and strap-like. They are also highly branched, resembling the form of antlers. The colour of oakmoss ranges from green to a greenish-white when dry, and dark olive-green to yellow-green when wet. The texture of the thalli is rough when dry and rubbery when wet. It is used extensively in modern perfumery.

Commercial uses
Oakmoss is commercially harvested in countries of South-Central Europe and usually exported to the Grasse region of France where its fragrant compounds are extracted as oakmoss absolutes and extracts. These raw materials are often used as perfume fixatives and form the base notes of many fragrances. They are also key components of Fougère and Chypre class perfumes. The lichen has a distinct and complex odor and can be described as woody, sharp and slightly sweet. Oakmoss growing on pines have a pronounced turpentine odor that is valued in certain perfume compositions.

In parts of Central Italy, oakmoss has been used as for biomonitoring the deposition of heavy metals at urban, rural, and industrial sites.  Studies of bioaccumulation for zinc, lead, chromium, cadmium, and copper in lichen samples were performed five times at regular intervals between November 2000 and December 2001.  As expected, the rural areas showed smaller impact of those five heavy metals when compared to urban and industrial areas.

Health and safety information
Oakmoss should be avoided by people with known skin sensitization issues. Its use in perfumes is now highly restricted by International Fragrance Association regulations, and many scents have been reformulated in recent years with other chemicals substituted for oakmoss.

Conservation status
Evernia prunastri is listed as critically endangered (CR) in Iceland, where it is found in only one location. As of April 2021, it has not been evaluated by the IUCN.

Gallery

See also
 Ethnolichenology
 Pseudevernia furfuracea, used as a substitute for oakmoss in perfumery

References

Parmeliaceae
Lichen species
Perfume ingredients
Taxa named by Carl Linnaeus
Lichens described in 1753
Fungi of Europe
Fungi of North America
Fungi of Iceland